The 2002–03 B Group was the 48th season of the Bulgarian B Football Group, the second tier of the Bulgarian football league system. A total of 16 teams contested the league.

League table

Promotion play-off

References

2002-03
Bul
2